Austin Methodist Church is a historic church at 135 Court Street in Austin, Nevada. The Italianate church building was constructed in 1866 and was added to the National Register of Historic Places in 2003.

It was dedicated on September 23, 1866, at which time a newspaper asserted this was "'the inauguration of the first edifice dedicated to Christian
worship in the American desert.'"

References

http://austinnv.blogspot.com/2008/10/methodist-church-in-austin-was-built.html

Methodist churches in Nevada
Churches on the National Register of Historic Places in Nevada
Italianate architecture in Nevada
Churches completed in 1866
19th-century Methodist church buildings in the United States
Churches in Lander County, Nevada
National Register of Historic Places in Lander County, Nevada
1866 establishments in Nevada
Italianate church buildings in the United States